Ardi (ARA-VP-6/500) is the designation of the fossilized skeletal remains of an Ardipithecus ramidus, believed to be an early human-like female anthropoid 4.4 million years old.

Ardi may also refer to:

Places
Ardi, Iran, a village in Kalkharan Rural District, in the Central District of Ardabil County, Ardabil Province, Iran
Ardi Musa, a village in the Sabalan District of Sareyn County, Ardabil Province, Iran

People
Ardi Liives (1929–1992), Estonian writer 
Ardi Qejvani (born 1993), Albanian footballer
Ardi Warsidi (born 1979), Indonesian footballer
Dana Beth Ardi, American entrepreneur, venture capitalist, human capitalist, author, and contemporary art collector

Others
ARDI, Access to Research for Development and Innovation program, a partnership between the World Intellectual Property Organization and major scientific and technical publishers